Kevin Brodbin is an Irish screenwriter. His credits include writing the screenplay and story for The Glimmer Man (1996) and Mindhunters (2004). He is also the co-author of Constantine (2005), the film adaptation of the DC Comics comic book Hellblazer. In addition, Brodbin worked on the film version of The A-Team. He scripted and produced the 2016 film The Siege of Jadotville, which was released by Netflix Original Films.

Filmography
 The Glimmer Man (1996)
 Mindhunters (2004)
 Constantine (2005)
 The Siege of Jadotville (2016) (Also producer)

References

1964 births
Living people
Irish male screenwriters